The Seagate Barracuda is a series of hard disk drives and later solid state drives produced by Seagate Technology that was first introduced in 1993.

The line initially focused on high-capacity, high-performance SCSI hard drives until introducing ATA models in 1999 and SATA models in 2002.  Since 2001, the Barracuda is Seagate's most popular product line as the hard disk drive industry started to move to a 7200 RPM spindle speed.

History 
In 1992, Seagate introduced the first ever 7200-RPM spindle speed hard drive, the Barracuda 1, sold in capacity of 1.7 GB with a size of 3.5 inches.

On July 24, 1995, Seagate has shipped over one million Barracuda hard drives.

On November 13, 2000, Seagate launched the Barracuda 180 series, it had the world's highest capacity for hard drives at the time, with 181 GB.

On December 3, 2001, Seagate introduced the Barracuda 36ES2 series, one of the last Barracuda SCSI series.

On December 2, 2002, Seagate began shipping the first ever Serial ATA hard drive, the Barracuda 7200.7 series.

On March 24, 2003, Seagate made their Serial ATA hard drive's available for retail consumers.

SCSI Models

Barracuda 1 & 2 
In 1993, Seagate released the first Barracuda drive, with the ST11950. The drive had a capacity of 2.03 GB (1.69 GB formatted), was available with FAST SCSI-2 (N/ND models) or WIDE SCSI-2 (W/WD models) interface, and was the first hard drive ever to have a spindle speed of 7200-RPM. Owing to the rotational speed, it was very fast but very expensive at the time. The FAST SCSI-2 interface of the N/ND model drives targeted them to servers and high-performance systems, with a 10 MB/s transfer speed. They came in a 3.5 inch "half height" format that was popular at the time, giving it a height of 1.63 inches or 41.4 mm. The drives came with a 5 year warranty, 500,000 hour Mean Time Between Failures rating, and a 4.17 msec latency.  Bus speeds of the original Barracuda line would soon go up to 100 Mbit/s by 1995, even as capacity increased substantially in the first 4 iterations of the Barracuda.

The Barracuda 1 series was immediately followed up by the Barracuda 2 series, which were the same for the most part except they offered a slightly higher capacity of 2.57 GB (2.1 GB formatted). There was an additional ST12450 model available, which offered 2 heads in parallel which meant it had two read and write channels at once, but it offered a slightly lower capacity of 1.8 GB. It was based on the Seagate Sabre 8" and Seagate Elite 5.25" lines of hard disk drives.

Barracuda 4 
The third generation Barracuda drive announced October 18th, 1993, with a expected release in the following year. Capacity was increased up to 4.1 GB formatted, but the drives were otherwise mostly the same to the Barracuda 1 & 2. 6 models were available, with N/ND models using the SCSI-2 FAST interface with 10 MB/s transfer speed while the W/WD/WC/DC used the SCSI-2 WIDE interface, which offered 20 MB/s speed.

Barracuda 180 
In late 2000, Seagate introduced the Barracuda 180 series with the ST1181677LW and ST1181677LC. They were the highest capacity hard drives in the world at the time. They had 12 platters with about 15 GB per platter, adding up to 181 GB. The 12 platters made the drive more larger than most drives at the time, with 1.6 inches in height. They had Tagged Command Queuing with up to 64 commands and a MTBF rating of 1.2 million hours, or 137 years. They also had a 26-47 MB/s transfer speed with the Ultra160 SCSI interface, and an average access time of 12.1 ms with 4 MB of on-board cache. On release the drives cost $1,850.

Later Seagate replaced the base models with the ST1181677LWV and ST1181677LCV, they had 16 MB of on-board cache versus 4, and were hot-swappable if they had the right cable connection, but were otherwise the same.

The series was discontinued in early 2004.

Barracuda 36ES 
The last SCSI Barracuda series was announced in December 2001, with the Barracuda 36ES2 series. The series was a successor to the Barracuda 36ES series. 4 models were available in 2 capacities. The ST318418N and ST318438LW had 18.4 GB while the ST336918N and ST336938LW had 36.9 GB, with 2 MB of on-board cache. Both capacity drives used one platter, with the 19.9 GB ones using one side of the platter. These drives were given an MTBF rating of 800,000 hours, 4.17 msec latency, and a transfer rate of 298 to 500 Mbit/s for 36.9 GB models and 434 to 500 Mbit/s for 18.4 GB models.

SCSI Models Table

ATA and SATA models

Barracuda ATA (1999)
Available in capacities between 6.8 GB and 28.2 GB, with a 512 KB cache buffer and an ATA/66 interface. This is the first model in the Barracuda family equipped with an ATA/IDE interface.

Barracuda ATA replaced Medalist Pro 6530/9140 drives, which were the world's first 7200 RPM ATA/IDE drives available on the market when launched in October 1997.

Barracuda ATA II (2000)
Available in capacities between 10 GB and 30 GB, with a 2 MB cache. Supports up to ATA/66 interface. Seagate announced launch of Barracuda ATA II on January 31, 2000.

Barracuda ATA III (2000)
Available in capacities between 10 GB and 40 GB, with a 2 MB cache. Supports up to ATA/100 interface. Seagate announced launch of Barracuda ATA III on September 6, 2000.

Barracuda ATA IV (2001)
Available in capacities between 20 GB and 80 GB, with a 2 MB cache. Supports up to the ATA/100 interface. These drives operate very quietly as they are one of the first hard drives to use fluid dynamic bearings in their spindle motors. Furthermore, their seek times were slowed in firmware to reduce noise output.

These disks cannot operate reliably at ATA/100 on RCC/ServerWorks IDE controllers, as their drivers blacklist the disks, thus limiting their operation to ATA/66.

Barracuda ATA IV was the first generation of Barracuda ATA drives to be available exclusively with fluid dynamic bearings in spindle motors. Seagate announced their launch on June 27, 2001.

Barracuda ATA V/ATA V Plus/Serial ATA V (2002)
Available in capacities between 30 GB (60 GB for SATA models) to 120 GB, with 2 MB cache (8 MB in SATA models), with either ATA/100 and SATA/150 interfaces. Barracuda V with SATA port is one of the first hard drives to feature a SATA interface.

The SATA models have many problems, including random data loss (such as disappearing partitions). These disks cannot work with some Silicon Image SATA controllers, as their drivers blacklist the disks and limit the maximum sectors of each transaction below 8 KB (15 sectors), leading to considerably reduced performance.

Seagate announced launch of Barracuda ATA V on June 24, 2002.

Barracuda 7200.7/7200.7 Plus (2002-2003)
Available in capacities between 40 GB and 200 GB, with ATA/100 and SATA interface options. The drives have 2 MB (marketed as Barracuda 7200.7) or 8 MB (marketed as Barracuda 7200.7 Plus) of cache, depending on the model. Seagate announced launch of Barracuda 7200.7 family on December 2, 2002 with 80 GB platters and capacities up to 160 GB. Raised capacities up to 200 GB using 100 GB platters became available in September 2003. SATA models were first launched without NCQ feature, NCQ models were added to offer in 2004 (models ST380817AS, ST3120827AS and ST3160827AS, capacities between 80 and 160 GB; non-NCQ models are ST380013AS, ST3120026AS and ST3160023AS).

A budget version of Barracuda 7200.7, marketed as U Series 9, with 1 MB of cache and different actuator mechanism, became available exclusively to OEMs in early 2003. They were available exclusively with ATA/100 interface. Produced capacities were 80, 120 and 160 GB.

Barracuda 7200.8 (2004)
Available in capacities between 200 GB and 400 GB, with either an ATA/100 or SATA interface with NCQ, these were sold alongside the 7200.7 series, providing higher capacities than the 7200.7. The drives have 8 MB or 16 MB of cache, depending on the model. It was the first generation of Barracuda drives to offer 16 MB of cache. Starting from Barracuda 7200.8 all SATA models are shipped with NCQ feature. Seagate announced launch of Barracuda 7200.8 on June 14, 2004.

Barracuda 7200.9 (2005)
Available in capacities between 40 GB and 500 GB, with either ATA/100 or SATA 3 Gbit/s interfaces and 2 MB, 8 MB or 16 MB of cache, depending on the model. All SATA models were available with new 3 Gbit/s interface (1,5 Gbit/s mode is available via jumper). Seagate announced launch of Barracuda 7200.9 on June 8, 2005.

Certain models of Barracuda 7200.9 drives were also available under Maxtor brand, the model name under this brand was DiamondMax 20. It was the oldest generation of Barracuda drives to be also offered under Maxtor brand after its acquisition by Seagate have been completed in 2006; model numbers of Maxtor-branded variants are identical as of Seagate ones but begin with STM letters.

Barracuda 7200.10 (2006)

Available in capacities between 80 GB to 750 GB and either an ATA/100 or SATA 3 Gbit/s interface. 2, 8 or 16 MB of cache, depending on the model. This was the first Seagate hard drive to use perpendicular magnetic recording (PMR) technology (only in 250 GB SATA models: ST3250410AS with 16 MB of cache and ST3250310AS with 8 MB of cache). Seagate announced launch of Barracuda 7200.10 on April 26, 2006. 250 GB PMR models were launched on June 7, 2007.

This is the last generation of Barracuda to feature IDE interface on certain models. This is the only generation of Barracuda to feature 750 GB as the greatest in storage limit of IDE drive ever made by any manufacturer. Industry's competitors ended development of IDE hard drives on lower capacities: Hitachi (despite having plans to offer 750 GB and 1 TB IDE drives which were eventually never produced and released), Maxtor (before its acquisition by Seagate) and Western Digital ended on 500 GB and Samsung ended on 400 GB.

Barracuda 7200.10 drives were also available under Maxtor brand, the model name under this brand was DiamondMax 21.

Firmware bug
The SATA models of this family with firmware 3.AAK [codename GALAXY] or older (e.g. 3.AAE[codename TONKA]) have introduced a firmware bug:

 There is a performance anomaly using hdparm with an NCQ queue depth of 31 in AHCI mode. Speed test measures only 55–64 MB/s (expected: >70–75 MB/s).

Seagate does not officially provide firmware updates for this issue; however, an unofficial firmware update (3.AAM) exists for the following drive models:

 ST3320820AS with part number 9BJ13G-308,
 ST3320620AS with part number 9BJ14G-308 (with firmware 3.AAK),
 ST3500830AS with part number 9BJ136-308 and
 ST3500630AS with part number 9BJ146-308.

Barracuda ES (2006)
Available in capacities between 250 GB to 750 GB, with SATA 3 Gbit/s interface and 8 or 16 MB of cache depending on model. The ES (Enterprise Storage) family were high-reliability drives based on Barracuda 7200.10 design. Intended for business-critical use, with all drives having a 5-year warranty.  Barracuda ES series replaced previous NL35 series (based on 7200.8) and NL35.2 series (based on 7200.9) enterprise drives. Seagate announced launch of Barracuda ES on June 7, 2006.

Barracuda 7200.11 (2007)
With a SATA 3 Gbit/s interface, capacities range from 160 GB to 1.5 TB. Codenames are Moose (earlier revision, using 250 GB platters) and Brinks (later revision, using 333 and 375 GB platters). Their cache size can be 8 MB, 16 MB or 32 MB, depending on the drive model. Seagate announced launch of Barracuda 7200.11, along with Barracuda ES.2, on June 25, 2007. They were also available under Maxtor brand, the model name under this brand was DiamondMax 22.

Alongside normally retailed models, a 2TB version (model number ST32000540AS) was produced in 2009, being marked on the label as Barracuda 7200.11; actually it's a pre-production series of Barracuda XT drives, installed in certain models of FreeAgent, Expansion and BlackArmor external drives. It uses the same mechanical design as in Barracuda XT and is unrelated to all other Barracuda 7200.11 models. Notable are also missing various international safety marks.

Firmware bug
This family has introduced many severe firmware bugs:

 Disks may not show and utilize all the cache.
 FLUSH_CACHE commands may time out when NCQ is used.
 There is a performance anomaly using hdparm with NCQ queue depth 31 in AHCI mode. Speed test measures only 45–50 MB/s (expected: > 100–110 MB/s).
 Disks may be inaccessible at power on.

Disks affected by the last bug will not be detected by the computer BIOS after a reboot. Numerous users have complained about this and are discussing it in a public forum when discussions in Seagate's forums were subjected to heavy moderation and subsequently closed. The symptom of the problem is that the computer BIOS will no longer detect the hard disk after a reboot, and upon connecting to the hard disk with a serial TTL board, this error code will be seen as "LED:000000CC FAddr:0024A051." Faulty firmware triggers this "failure."

Seagate FreeAgent external drives have also utilized 7200.11 hard disks with the SDxx firmware, and failures of these hard drives were also reported. The access LED remains permanently on, despite being disconnected from USB and no longer being recognized by the computer. However, Seagate says that the LED light remaining permanently on had nothing to do with firmware problems. The drives have also become known for their unusually high failure rates, including sudden mechanical failures; the rapid development of large numbers of bad sectors; the motherboard detecting the drive as a different model and the drive regularly "freezing" when being read from or written to.

Other companies have claimed to be able to resolve this problem using their own solution, namely Ace Laboratory PC3000-UDMA (version 4.13).

In order to fix the first bug, Seagate released firmware update AD14 for the affected disk models; to fix the second, third and fourth bugs, Seagate released firmware updates SD1A, SD1B, SD2B and SD81. The SD2B firmware update for Brinks removes the DCO ATA feature from the disks, while SD1A for Moose adds two ATA features.

Barracuda ES.2 (2007)
Available in capacities between 250 GB (500 GB for SAS models) and 1 TB, 16 MB cache for SAS models and a 32 MB cache for SATA 3 Gbit/s models. Enterprise-grade drives based on 7200.11 series. SAS models were the first Barracuda drives with server-grade interface since the discontinuation of Barracuda 180 in 2004.

Firmware bugs
Similar to the 7200.11 family, this family has introduced many firmware bugs, which was fixed by SN06 firmware released by Seagate:

 RAID arrays using these disks may fail.
 Secure Erase command is not handled properly.
 There is a performance anomaly using hdparm with NCQ queue depth 31 in AHCI mode. Speed test measures only 50 MB/s (expected: >100 MB/s).
 Disks may be inaccessible at power on.

Barracuda ES.2 is currently the last product in Seagate's enterprise line to bear the "Barracuda" name. The successor of ES.2, launched in early 2013, is branded as "Constellation ES.3" which is based on the design of 14th-generation Barracuda.

Barracuda 7200.12 (2009)
Available in capacities between 160 GB to 1 TB. Initial models (CCxx firmware) supported up to SATA 3 Gbit/s, while later revisions (firmware JCxx) support the newer SATA 6 Gbit/s interface. Their cache size can be 8 MB, 16 MB or 32 MB, depending on the drive model. Uses 500 GB platters. Power consumption is reduced from previous models, resulting in lower heat dissipation and claimed reliability improvements. Seagate announced launch of Barracuda 7200.12 on January 5, 2009. SATA 6 Gbit/s models replaced SATA 3 Gbit/s models in January 2011.

Barracuda 7200.12 drives were also available under Maxtor brand, the model name under this brand was DiamondMax 23. Only SATA 3 Gbit/s models were available under Maxtor brand and was the last generation of DiamondMax drives produced. Seagate phased out Maxtor brand in October 2009, reviving it in 2016, except for internal HDDs.

Barracuda XT, LP and Green (13th generation) (2009/10)

Available in capacities between 2 TB and 3 TB (XT) with 64 MB cache, 1 TB and 2 TB (LP) with 16 MB or 32 MB cache, 1 TB, 1.5 TB and 2 TB (Green) with 16 MB to 64 MB cache depending on model. This is the first Barracuda series to support SATA 6 Gbit/s and its buffer size is 64 MB. Rotation speed is 7,200 RPM for XT, and 5,900 RPM for LP and Green.

Barracuda XT was launched on September 21, 2009.

Barracuda XT is intended for high-performance gaming computers and workstations with sustained data transfer rate of 149 MB/s. LP is designated for mass storage applications favoring low heat output, quiet operation and better-than-average energy efficiency. The Barracuda Green series was introduced in December 2010 as a high-performance, eco-friendly, low-power internal drive, replacing the Barracuda LP series. It is the first to use Advanced Format sectors and operates at 5900 RPM.

Barracuda XT used re-engineered mechanical design, which featured, for the first time in desktop hard drives from Seagate, a head unload ramp, a feature shared with Western Digital, Toshiba, and HGST drives at the time that keeps the heads from ever having to touch the platters and drastically improving the rated start/stop cycle count. The same design was later re-used in Seagate's enterprise hard drives. Original Barracuda LP models used the same mechanical design as used in Barracuda 7200.11 drives, later ones (and Green models), like XT, also used re-engineered mechanical design, but was different. It was later re-used in 14th generation of Barracuda drives.

Firmware bugs
The Barracuda LP series also present firmware issues that might be alleviated by the latest firmware available on the Seagate web site (CC35), although there are reports that drives with the CC35 firmware loaded continue to exhibit the same problems as earlier firmware releases. The most commonly referred issue with the Barracuda LP series drives appears to be one variation or another of the infamous click of death problem; the drive will start to emit a regular clicking noise at some point in its early life (possibly even at first start) and after some time will fail altogether, often after a few months of use. While the clicking noise is emitted, the hard drive is inaccessible and may prevent the BIOS from detecting it.

There is also a CC95 firmware (at least some of those drives came as part of external Seagate FreeAgent drives), but it is not clear whether this build fixes all known issues, and why firmware versions between CC35 and CC95 do not seem to exist.

Barracuda (14th generation) (2012)

Available in capacities between 250 GB to 3 TB, 7200 RPM, 16 MB to 64 MB cache, depending on the model. First Seagate hard drives with 1 TB per platter technology. From this generation onwards, Seagate phased out previous "green" models, citing the inherent power saving functions featured on the 14th generation removed the need for a separate low-power design. One model in particular, ST3000DM001, is notable for its high failure rate, frequently experiencing bad sector growth and head crashes.

BarraCuda (16th generation) (2016)
The successor of the 14th generation Barracuda, branded as "Desktop HDD", was a 5,900 RPM series launched in early 2013 and was not considered part of the Barracuda line.

"Barracuda" name made a comeback in 2016, stylized by Seagate as BarraCuda. Available in capacities between 500 GB to 8 TB. Buffer sizes vary from 32 MB for 500 GB and 1 TB models to 256 MB for 3 TB to 8 TB units. Currently listed BarraCuda drives mostly use shingled magnetic recording (SMR) technology to write data onto platters, and spin up at 5400 RPM (exception is model ST2000DM008, which spins up at 7200 RPM while utilizing SMR technology). 500 GB and 1 TB models still use perpendicular magnetic recording technology and spin at 7200 RPM, but they also do not feature load/unload ramps, instead using contact start/stop technology.

BarraCuda Pro (2016)
Available in capacities between 2 TB and 14 TB. Launched alongside BarraCuda, it is described as "Perfect for high performance desktop, creative pro desktop applications, and gaming". This series has higher read/write performance than standard BarraCuda drives; one PCWorld review noted its consistent read speed throughout its entire capacity, which is unusual for a conventional HDD.

While 2 and 4 TB models feature 128 MB of cache, all other capacities feature 256 MB of cache. Capacities from 8 TB are helium-sealed drives, while lower ones (including 8 TB model ST8000DM005) are air-sealed. All models spin up at 7200 RPM, have 512 bytes per sector and write data onto platter using perpendicular magnetic recording technology.

Warranty length 
Warranty period is either 1 year, 2 years, 3 years or 5 years from the documented date of purchase, depending on the type of product and where it was purchased.

See also
Seagate SeaShield

References

External links
 Seagate Barracuda Hard Drives
 How to Force Firmware update on the Seagate Barracuda LP

Computer storage devices
Seagate Technology